Scythris formicella is a moth of the family Scythrididae. It was described by Pierre Chrétien in 1915. It is found in Algeria.

The larvae have been recorded feeding on Herniaria fruticosa.

References

formicella
Moths described in 1915
Moths of Africa